Ewald Jenisch (born 29 February 1964) is a retired Austrian football defender and later manager.

References

1964 births
Living people
Austrian footballers
SV Stockerau players
First Vienna FC players
Kremser SC players
1. Simmeringer SC players
Association football defenders
Austrian Football Bundesliga players
Austrian football managers
Austria under-21 international footballers